The 1919–20 City Cup was the twenty-second edition of the City Cup, a cup competition in Irish football.

The tournament was won by Linfield for the 11th time.

Group standings

References

1919–20 in Irish association football